Zaklopača is a village in Croatia. It is connected by the D504 highway. It was the site of a mass murder of  57 Bosniak citizens in 1992.

References 

Populated places in Lika-Senj County
Serb communities in Croatia